In enzymology, a N-acetylglucosaminylphosphatidylinositol deacetylase is an enzyme that catalyzes the chemical reaction

6-(N-acetyl-alpha-D-glucosaminyl)-1-phosphatidyl-1D-myo-inositol + H2O  6-(alpha-D-glucosaminyl)-1-phosphatidyl-1D-myo-inositol + acetate

Thus, the two substrates of this enzyme are 6-(N-acetyl-alpha-D-glucosaminyl)-1-phosphatidyl-1D-myo-inositol and H2O, whereas its two products are 6-(alpha-D-glucosaminyl)-1-phosphatidyl-1D-myo-inositol and acetate.

This enzyme belongs to the family of hydrolases, those acting on carbon-nitrogen bonds other than peptide bonds, specifically in linear amides.  The systematic name of this enzyme class is 6-(N-acetyl-alpha-D-glucosaminyl)-1-phosphatidyl-1D-myo-inositol acetylhydrolase. Other names in common use include N-acetyl-D-glucosaminylphosphatidylinositol acetylhydrolase, N-acetylglucosaminylphosphatidylinositol de-N-acetylase, GlcNAc-PI de-N-acetylase, GlcNAc-PI deacetylase, and acetylglucosaminylphosphatidylinositol deacetylase.  This enzyme participates in 3 metabolic pathways: glycosylphosphatidylinositol(gpi)-anchor, and glycan structures - biosynthesis 2.

References

 
 
 
 

EC 3.5.1
Enzymes of unknown structure